Eduardo Ernesto Centeno Jiménez (born 30 May 1984) is a Venezuelan-born Dominican footballer who plays as a centre back for Atlético Pantoja and the Dominican Republic national team.

International career
Centeno was eligible to play for Dominican Republic through his mother. His formal debut was on 25 March 2018, being a second-half substitute in a 2–1 friendly win against Saint Kitts and Nevis. He had played two friendly matches in November 2017 against Nicaragua, but they were not recognised by FIFA.

References

External links

1984 births
Living people
Dominican Republic footballers
Association football central defenders
Venezuelan Primera División players
A.C.C.D. Mineros de Guayana players
Carabobo F.C. players
Liga Dominicana de Fútbol players
Dominican Republic international footballers
Dominican Republic people of Venezuelan descent
People from Bolívar (state)
Venezuelan people of Dominican Republic descent
Citizens of the Dominican Republic through descent
Academia Puerto Cabello players